Lloyd Barrington Smith (1917 – 8 April 1992) was a Jamaican stamp dealer who is known for his patriotic covers supporting the allies during the Second World War.

Early life and family
Lloyd Barrington Smith was born in 1917. He married Kathleen Dickson on 18 November 1939.

Career
As a stamp dealer, Barrington Smith dealt principally in used British Commonwealth stamps, but the home-made and naive patriotic covers that he sold in bulk during the war years have become collectable in their own right. Barrington Smith traded from 1935 until about 1962, initially as a printer, soon becoming a stamp dealer and later a stamp wholesaler and supplier of "tropical novelties". He is not believed to have been connected with the Leicester, England, firm of philatelic accessary wholesalers Barrington Smith.

He traded under his own name and also as the Buccaneer Hobby Club from 127 Hagley Park Road, Half Way Tree Post Office, Jamaica, and was the publisher of The West Indian Philatelist.

Death
Barrington Smith died on 8 April 1992.

Publications
Dollar Making Stamps, Half Way Tree, Jamaica: Barrington Smith Publications, 1940.

References

Further reading
 "The Elusive Mr Odom", David Horry, Gibbons Stamp Monthly, Vol. 45, No. 5 (October 2014), pp. 132-134.
 "George Odom and L. Barrington Smith", David Horry, Gibbons Stamp Monthly, Vol. 46, No. 8 (January 2016), pp. 114-119.

External links
Derek Sutcliffe Collection of Jamaica.

Philately of Jamaica
Stamp dealers
1917 births
1992 deaths
Date of birth missing
People from Kingston, Jamaica